Scott Edward Stewart (born August 14, 1975) is an American former professional baseball pitcher.

Career
Stewart was drafted by the Texas Rangers in the 20th round of the 1994 MLB Draft. He played for the Gulf Coast Rangers in 1994 and the Charleston RiverDogs in 1995 before the Rangers released him. He hooked up with the Gulf Coast Twins to finish the season. He played in an independent league in 1996 and then was purchased by the New York Mets who sent him to the St. Lucie Mets in 1997 and then to the Binghamton Mets (1998–1999) and  Norfolk Tides (1998–2000).

Signed as a minor league free agent by the Montreal Expos in 2001, he played for the Ottawa Lynx briefly and then made his MLB debut with the Expos that year, appearing in 62 games in 2001, 67 in 2002 and 51 in 2003 for Montreal. In 2004, the Expos traded Stewart to the Cleveland Indians for Maicer Izturis and Ryan Church. The Indians assigned him to their AAA team, the Buffalo Bisons. He was later called up and appeared in 23 games for the Indians. After a trade to the Los Angeles Dodgers, he appeared in another 11 games for L.A. Stewart spent 2005 with the Norfolk Tides (New York Mets) and Portland Beavers (San Diego Padres), and did not pitch afterwards.

External links
, or Baseball Almanac, or Retrosheet
Pelota Binaria

1975 births
Living people
American expatriate baseball players in Canada
Baseball players at the 1999 Pan American Games
Baseball players from Massachusetts
Binghamton Mets players
Brevard County Manatees players
Buffalo Bisons (minor league) players
Charleston RiverDogs players
Cleveland Indians players
Gulf Coast Rangers players
Gulf Coast Twins players
Las Vegas 51s players
Los Angeles Dodgers players
Major League Baseball pitchers
Montreal Expos players
Norfolk Tides players
Ottawa Lynx players
Pan American Games medalists in baseball
Pan American Games silver medalists for the United States
Pastora de los Llanos players
American expatriate baseball players in Venezuela
People from Stoughton, Massachusetts
Portland Beavers players
Sportspeople from Brockton, Massachusetts
St. Lucie Mets players
St. Paul Saints players
United States national baseball team players
Medalists at the 1999 Pan American Games
American expatriate baseball players in Australia